William Starmer may refer to:
 William T. Starmer, professor of biology
 William Austin Starmer, sheet music cover artist